Euphaedra murphyi is a butterfly in the family Nymphalidae. It is found in Malawi.

References

Butterflies described in 1991
murphyi
Endemic fauna of Malawi
Butterflies of Africa